Mahinda Wijesekera is a Sri Lankan politician, former Fisheries cabinet minister and a former member of the Parliament of Sri Lanka.  
In 2001, Wijesekara left the President Chandrika Kumaratunga's ruling Sri Lanka Freedom Party and joined United National Party along with few other senior ministers of the government such as S. B. Dissanayake and G. L. Peiris. He was a member of the working committee of UNP and the party organiser for Weligama. However, in 2006 UNP leader Ranil Wickramasinghe removed from all of his positions in the party as a result of internal crisis against the leadership.
On 2007, Wijesekara again crossed over to United People's Freedom Alliance government. He was the Telecommunications Minister in the government.
He was injured in a suicide bombing in 2009.

References

Year of birth missing (living people)
Living people
Members of the 9th Parliament of Sri Lanka
Members of the 10th Parliament of Sri Lanka
Members of the 11th Parliament of Sri Lanka
Members of the 12th Parliament of Sri Lanka
Members of the 13th Parliament of Sri Lanka
Sri Lanka Freedom Party politicians
United National Party politicians
United People's Freedom Alliance politicians
Fisheries ministers of Sri Lanka
Failed assassination attempts in Sri Lanka